Combat Mission II: Barbarossa to Berlin is a 2002 computer wargame developed and published by Battlefront.com. A turn-based computer game about tactical battles in World War II, it is the sequel to Combat Mission: Beyond Overlord. The game has been described as the "reigning champ of east front tactical warfare for the PC."

Features
Barbarossa to Berlin is both a complement to the earlier Combat Mission: Beyond Overlord, in that it presented a different theatre of war, as well as a sequel, by way of improving game features and adding new ones. The playable nations are: Nazi Germany, Soviet Union, Romania (pre- and post- defection), Hungary, Finland, Poland (under Soviet command) and Italy.

In order to conform to German law, depictions of the swastika were removed. Additionally, all Waffen SS units were renamed "Waffen Grenadier".

Demo
A playable public demo is offered by Battlefront.com. The demo did not include access to the mission editor, but did permit solo, hotseat, email or TCP/IP play of two pre-made scenarios.

Alternate titles
The game was originally released as Combat Mission: Barbarossa to Berlin; it was known in Europe as Combat Mission 2.

A Special Edition, known as Combat Mission II: Barbarossa to Berlin (Special Edition) was released with a "bonus disc" which included graphic mods and additional scenarios collected from designers within the CM community.

Reception

The game received "generally favorable reviews", just one point short of "universal acclaim", according to the review aggregation website Metacritic. GameSpot named it the second-best computer game of October 2002. It was also a runner-up for GameSpots annual "Best Single-Player Strategy Game on PC" award, which went to Medieval: Total War.

It was a runner-up for GameSpy's 2002 "PC Strategy Game of the Year" award, which ultimately went to Medieval: Total War. The editors wrote of Combat Mission II, "This sleeper hit might be hard to find, but if you like realistic World War II tactics you owe it to yourself to track down a copy." Barbarossa to Berlin won Computer Gaming Worlds 2002 "Wargame of the Year" award. The editors wrote that it "doesn't change the genre the way its predecessor did, [but] it still towers high above the competition."

References

External links
Official website

2002 video games
Battlefront.com games
Classic Mac OS games
Multiplayer hotseat games
Turn-based tactics video games
Windows games
World War II video games
Video games developed in the United States
Video games set in Finland
Computer wargames
CDV Software Entertainment games